Ulrike Lehmann (born 11 June 1982) is a German short track speed skater. She competed in the women's 3000 metre relay event at the 2002 Winter Olympics.

References

1982 births
Living people
German female short track speed skaters
Olympic short track speed skaters of Germany
Short track speed skaters at the 2002 Winter Olympics
Sportspeople from Rostock
21st-century German women